San Miguel Tulancingo  is a town and municipality in Oaxaca in south-western Mexico.
It is part of the Coixtlahuaca district in the Mixteca Region.

As of 2005, the municipality had a total population of 336.

References

Municipalities of Oaxaca